The Confederación Revolucionaria de Obreros y Campesinos (CROC) is a Mexican trade union confederation. It is one of the most important and influential trade unions in the History of Mexico.

It was founded in April 1952. during a congress made by four workers centrals. Until 1980 the CROC had 750 000 workers inside the union, in only 17 of the 31 states and the Federal District (Mexico City); in this year the statements change in order to change the organization of the union by changing the presidency of the union, that was rotative and with only one year of duration to a presidency headed by a National Secretary General (Secretario General del Comité Ejecutivo Nacional).

It currently has 4.5 million worker members throughout the 32 states in the country having also 17 National Industrial Confederacies; also 3.600 unions with 15 000 collective contracts.

External links 
History of the Confederación Revolucionaria de Obreros y Campesinos (Campesinos an Workers Revolutionary Confederacy) 

National trade union centers of Mexico
World Federation of Trade Unions
1952 establishments in Mexico
Trade unions established in 1952